Podreča (in older sources also Podreče) is a village on the right bank of the Sava River in the City Municipality of Kranj in the Upper Carniola region of Slovenia.

Name
Podreča was attested in written sources in 1334 as Patriarchsdorf, and in 1437 as de Patriarchali villa. The name is derived from *Podreča (vas) (literally, 'patriarch's village'); the first element is a possessive adjective from the noun podreka 'patriarch'. In the Middle Ages the village was a property of the Patriarchate of Aquileia, and so the name refers to historical ownership. A small rise near the settlement known as Abbot's Hill is also reminiscent of this ecclesiastical heritage.

History
In 1929 a monument was set up behind the church, marking the former site of the house where the Slovene poet and writer Simon Jenko (1835–1869) was born.

Church

The local church is dedicated to Saints Cantius, Cantianus, and Cantianilla. It dates from 1854 and was restored after the 1895 Ljubljana earthquake. The church contains an altar created by one of the Goetzls in 1874.

Notable people
Notable people that were born or lived in Podreča include:
Simon Jenko (1835–1869), poet and writer

References

External links

Podreča on Geopedia

Populated places in the City Municipality of Kranj